Jaki is a given name and a surname which may refer to:

 John Jaki Byard (1922–1999), American jazz pianist, composer and arranger
 Jacqueline Jaki Graham (born 1956), British R&B singer-songwriter
 Jaki Liebezeit (born 1938), German drummer
 Jaki Numazawa, ring name of Japanese professional wrestler Naoki Fukui (born 1977)
 Patryk Jaki (born 1985), Polish politician
 Stanley Jaki (1924–2009), Hungarian-born American Roman Catholic priest, historian and philosopher
 Jaki Manu, a character in the New Zealand soap opera Shortland Street

See also
 Jackie (given name)
 Jacqui